The Sprite class were a class of spirit tankers that served with the Royal Fleet Auxiliary, supporting the Royal Navy during the Second World War. They went on to support British and allied fleet units during the Cold War.

Class overview
They entered service in the during the Second World War and were used to carry aviation fuel and petroleum. Both survived the war, serving mainly in British waters and the Mediterranean Sea, and continued in service until being retired in the early 1960s and scrapped soon afterwards.

Ships

Notes

References

 
Auxiliary transport ship classes
 Sprite
Auxiliary replenishment ship classes